Paramaxillaria meretrix is a species of snout moth. It is found in Turkey and North Africa, including Libya.

References

Moths described in 1879
Phycitini
Insects of Turkey